The Omaha Structural Steel Works was a company also known as Omaha Steel Works and as Omaha Structural Steel Bridge Co.in Omaha, Nebraska

A number of its works are listed in the U.S. National Register of Historic Places.

Works include (with variations in attribution):
AJX Bridge over South Fork and Powder River, I-25 W. Service Rd. (old hwy 87), Kaycee, Wyoming (Omaha Steel Works), NRHP-listed
Columbus Loup River Bridge, US 30 over the Loup R., Columbus, Nebraska (Omaha Steel Works), NRHP-listed
Lake Zumbro Hydroelectric Generating Plant, off Co. Hwy. 21 at N end of Lake Zumbro, Mazeppa Township, Mazeppa, Minnesota (Omaha Structural Steel Bridge Co.), NRHP-listed
Main Street Bridge, Main St. over W. Papillion Cr., Elkhorn, Nebraska (Omaha Structural Steel Works), NRHP-listed
Ocean to Ocean Bridge, Penitentiary Ave, Yuma, Arizona (Omaha Structural Steel Works), NRHP-listed
Plattsmouth Bridge, US 34 over the Missouri R., Pacific Junction, Iowa and Plattsmouth, Nebraska (Omaha Structural Steel Works), NRHP-listed
Red Cloud Bridge, NE 281 over the Republican R., 2 mi. S of Red Cloud, Red Cloud, Nebraska (Omaha Steel Works), NRHP-listed
St. Joseph Bridge, 4.4 mi. SE of Joseph City on Joseph City-Holbrook Rd., Joseph City, Arizona (Omaha Structural Steel Works), NRHP-listed
Woodruff Bridge, 4 mi. S of Woodruff on Woodruff-Snowflake Rd., Woodruff, Arizona (Omaha Structural Steel Works), NRHP-listed

Shipyard

For World War 2 in 1944 Omaha Steel Works built YSD-11 Class Seaplane Wrecking Derrick, Hull classification symbol YSD is for Yard Seaplane Dirrick, Yard as in ship repair yard:
YSD 66  
YSD 67   
YSD 68   
YSD 69

References

Bridge companies
Structural steel
Construction and civil engineering companies of the United States